
Gmina Zaklików is a rural gmina (administrative district) in Stalowa Wola County, Subcarpathian Voivodeship, in south-eastern Poland.

Villages
Gmina Zaklików contains the villages and settlements of Antoniówka, Dąbrowa, Gielnia, Goliszowiec, Irena, Józefów, Karkówka, Kruszyna, Łążek, Lipa, Łysaków, Łysaków-Kolonia, Nowe Baraki, Stare Baraki, Zaklików, Zdziechowice Drugie and Zdziechowice Pierwsze.

Neighbouring gminas
Gmina Zaklików is bordered by the gminas of Gościeradów, Potok Wielki, Pysznica, Radomyśl nad Sanem and Trzydnik Duży.

References

Polish official population figures 2006

Zaklikow
Stalowa Wola County